Digital first is a communication theory that publishers should release content into new media channels in preference to old media. The premise behind the theory is that after the advent of Internet, most established media organizations continued to give priority to traditional media. Over time, those organizations faced a choice to either publish first in digital media or traditional media. A "digital first" decision occurs when a publisher chooses to distribute information online in preference to or at the expense of traditional media like print publishing.

Many employers and employees find it challenging to imagine using digital first practices.

Distributing content digital first introduces new practices, including a need to manage the data which tracks readership.

Many paper print publishers feel intimidated by the idea of publishing content online before publishing it in paper media.

Comedian John Oliver in the show Last Week Tonight criticized digital first practices as a cause of lower standards in journalism.

References

External links
Digital First and the Future of News, a 2011 presentation by the CUNY Graduate School of Journalism
Digital First, a 2015 guide by the Welsh Government sharing their intent to favor online publication over print

New media
Digital media